Patxi Ruiz (born February 27, 1980) is a former champion in Basque pelota.

References

Spanish pelotaris
Living people
1980 births
People from Estella Oriental
Pelotaris from Navarre
21st-century Spanish people